Robert Bogumił Mateusiak (born 13 January 1976) is a Polish retired badminton player.

Career 
Łogosz and Mateusiak won bronze medals at the European Championships in 2000, 2002, 2004, and 2006. Partnered with Nadieżda Zięba in the mixed doubles event, they won a silver medal at the 2008 European Badminton Championships and a gold medal at the 2012 European Badminton Championships.

Mateusiak competed in badminton at the 2000 and the 2004 Summer Olympics, both times in the men's doubles with partner Michał Łogosz. In 2000, they defeated David Bamford and Peter Blackburn of Australia in the first round. They lost in the round of 16 to Simon Archer and Nathan Robertson of United Kingdom. In 2004, they defeated Sigit Budiarto and Tri Kusharjanto of Indonesia in the first round, then were defeated in the round of 16 by Kim Dong-moon and Ha Tae-kwon of South Korea.

In 2008 Summer Olympics, Mateusiak competed in two events. He reached in to the quarter-finals round both in the men's doubles event with Łogosz and in the mixed doubles with Nadieżda Kostiuczyk (Zięba since 2010). In 2012 Summer Olympics, he competed in the mixed doubles with Zięba.  They reached the quarter finals but were beaten by Xu Chen and Ma Jin of China. In 2016 Summer Olympics, he and Zięba advanced to the knocked-out stage after being at the top of the standings of group B. They were defeated by Chan Peng Soon and Goh Liu Ying of Malaysia in the quarter final.

Achievements

European Championships 
Men's doubles

Mixed doubles

BWF Superseries (2 titles) 
The BWF Superseries, which was launched on 14 December 2006 and implemented in 2007, was a series of elite badminton tournaments, sanctioned by the Badminton World Federation (BWF). BWF Superseries levels were Superseries and Superseries Premier. A season of Superseries consisted of twelve tournaments around the world that had been introduced since 2011. Successful players were invited to the Superseries Finals, which were held at the end of each year.

Mixed doubles

  BWF Superseries Finals tournament
  BWF Superseries Premier tournament
  BWF Superseries tournament

BWF Grand Prix (6 titles, 3 runners-up) 
The BWF Grand Prix had two levels, the Grand Prix and Grand Prix Gold. It was a series of badminton tournaments sanctioned by the Badminton World Federation (BWF) and played between 2007 and 2017. The World Badminton Grand Prix was sanctioned by the International Badminton Federation from 1983 to 2006.

Men's doubles

Mixed doubles

  BWF Grand Prix Gold tournament
  BWF & IBF Grand Prix tournament

BWF International Challenge/Series (41 titles, 16 runners-up) 
Men's doubles

Mixed doubles

  BWF International Challenge tournament
  BWF International Series tournament
  BWF Future Series tournament

Record against selected opponents 
Mixed doubles results with Nadieżda Zięba against year-end Finals finalists, World Championships semi-finalists, and Olympic quarter-finalists.

See also 
 List of athletes with the most appearances at Olympic Games

References

External links 
 
 
 profile 
 

1976 births
Living people
People from Wołomin
Sportspeople from Masovian Voivodeship
Polish male badminton players
Badminton players at the 2000 Summer Olympics
Badminton players at the 2004 Summer Olympics
Badminton players at the 2008 Summer Olympics
Badminton players at the 2012 Summer Olympics
Badminton players at the 2016 Summer Olympics
Olympic badminton players of Poland
World No. 1 badminton players